William Allen Blair House is a historic home located at Winston-Salem, Forsyth County, North Carolina.  It was built in 1901, and is a two-story, Colonial Revival style frame dwelling. It has a one-story, wrap-around front porch and Porte-cochère.  The house features a high hipped roof with gabled dormers and central facade gable with a projecting second story bay and a Palladian window.

It was listed on the National Register of Historic Places in 1985.

References

Houses on the National Register of Historic Places in North Carolina
Colonial Revival architecture in North Carolina
Houses completed in 1901
Houses in Winston-Salem, North Carolina
National Register of Historic Places in Winston-Salem, North Carolina